James Finley House, also known as the Commanding Officer's Residence, is a historic home located at Letterkenny Army Depot in Greene Township in Franklin County, Pennsylvania. It was built about 1778, and is a -story, limestone farmhouse.  It is five bays wide and has a medium pitched gable roof.  The house was obtained for use as the Commanding Officer's Residence in 1942.  It is one of the oldest surviving dwellings in Franklin County.

It was listed on the National Register of Historic Places in 1974.

References

External links

Houses on the National Register of Historic Places in Pennsylvania
Houses completed in 1778
Houses in Franklin County, Pennsylvania
National Register of Historic Places in Franklin County, Pennsylvania